Emily Dunning Barringer (September 27, 1876 - April 8, 1961) was the world's first female ambulance surgeon and the first woman to secure a surgical residency.

Emily Dunning was born in Scarsdale, New York to Edwin James Dunning and Frances Gore Lang. The well-to-do New York family fell on hard times when she was about ten years old, and her father left for Europe to try to recoup his fortune, leaving her mother with five children. When a well-meaning friend of Dunning's mother suggested that the girl might become a milliner's apprentice, her mother said "That settles the question. You are going to go to college." Dr. Mary Corinna Putnam Jacobi, a friend of the family, recommended Cornell University's medical preparatory course, and her uncle, Henry W. Sage, a founder of Cornell, agreed to pay her tuition. Other family friends also helped with expenses. Emily Dunning graduated in 1897 and decided to attend the College of Medicine of the New York Infirmary. During her sophomore year there, the college merged with the new Cornell University School of Medicine.

She earned her medical degree in 1901, then received the second-highest grade in the qualifying exam for an internship at Gouverneur Hospital in New York City. The hospital denied her application. The next year she applied again, this time with the support from political and religious figures, and the hospital accepted her—the first woman ever accepted for post-graduate surgical training in service to a hospital.

Residency

"Barringer's fellow medical residents assigned her difficult 'on call' schedules and ward duties, and harassed her in other ways," according to the Web site of the National Medical Library. She wrote about the harassment in her autobiography, which "illustrates the value of support from mentors, family, friends, nursing staff, and the public." A woman doctor was a curiosity for the Lower East Side neighborhood where she worked, and New York City newspapers published feature articles about her.

She married Benjamin Barringer, also a physician, the day after she finished her residency in 1904. The couple had two children, Benjamin Lang Barringer (1910-1992) and Velona Barringer Steever (1918-1989).

During World War I, she served as vice-chair of the American Women's Hospitals War Service Committee of the National Medical Women's Association (later the American Medical Women's Association) and led a campaign to raise money for
ambulances to be sent to Europe.

Later career

After the war, Barringer took a post on the gynecological staff at New York Polyclinic Hospital. She was also an attending surgeon at the New York Infirmary for Women and Children, specializing in the study of venereal disease.
She also became an attending surgeon at Kingston Avenue Hospital in Brooklyn and later its director of gynecology.

Barringer was an advocate of women's suffrage and worked to improve medical education for women, public health, and reforms for the treatment of imprisoned women. She was President of the American Medical Women's Association in 1942.  As Co-chair of the association's War Service Committee, she organized the American Women's Hospital in Europe, which provided medical and surgical care during and after the war.

During World War II, Barringer lobbied Congress to allow women doctors to serve as commissioned officers in the Army Medical Reserve Corps. Congress passed the Sparkman Act in 1943, which granted women the right to receive commissions in the Army, Navy, and Public Health Service.

She later lived in Darien and New Canaan, Connecticut. She was inducted into the Connecticut Women's Hall of Fame in 2000.

Her autobiography, Bowery to Bellevue: The Story of New York's First Woman Ambulance Surgeon,  was made into a 1952 film, The Girl in White, by MGM.

References

External links
 Emily Dunning Barringer page at the National Library of Medicine Web site
 Emily Dunning Barringer Inductee Profile at the Connecticut Women's Hall of Fame
  Detailed review of The Girl in White.

1876 births
1961 deaths
People from Darien, Connecticut
People from Scarsdale, New York
20th-century American physicians
Weill Cornell Medical College alumni
American women's rights activists
Women surgeons
20th-century American women physicians
20th-century surgeons